The Hesperia Open Invitational was a golf tournament on the PGA Tour in the late 1950s and early 1960s.

It was played at the Hesperia Golf and County Club in the high desert town of Hesperia, California. The course record for lowest round (62) was set in 1959 by Gene Littler.

Winners

Notes

References

Former PGA Tour events
Golf in California
Hesperia, California